The Aero Ae 03 was a prototype Czechoslovakian military reconnaissance aircraft designed in 1921. It was an ambitious monoplane design, and was completely original to Aero, unlike the firm's licence-built designs from World War I. It was to be equipped with an early turbocharger.

As work progressed, it became clear that the finished product would not meet the Czech Air Force specifications required, as it would be too heavy. Redesign was judged to be impractical, and so construction was halted before the aircraft ever flew.

Specifications (Ae 03)

References 

Ae03
Single-engined tractor aircraft
1920s Czechoslovakian military reconnaissance aircraft